Paramedics is an Australian factual television series that looks at the everyday working of paramedics in Victoria, and is narrated by Australia actor Samuel Johnson.

The show premiered on 4 October 2018, and looks at the everyday workings of paramedics, healthcare professionals working mainly as part of emergency medical services (EMS) using road ambulances, helicopters, Mobile Intensive Care Ambulance (MICA) and motorcycles.

The show was renewed for a second season, which premiered on 11 February 2020. A third season will go to air in 2021. The fourth season premiered 29 September 2022. The show was renewed for a fifth season in 2022.

Series overview

Episodes

Season 1 (2018)

Season 2 (2020)

Season 3 (2021)

References

Nine Network original programming
2018 Australian television series debuts
Australian factual television series
English-language television shows